Walter Loos (11 April 1923 – 27 October 2004) was a former Luftwaffe fighter ace and recipient of the Knight's Cross of the Iron Cross during World War II. During his career, he was credited with 38 aerial victories in 66 missions.

World War II
In January 1944, Loos was posted to IV. Gruppe (4th group) of Jagdgeschwader 3 "Udet" (JG 3—3rd Fighter Wing). At the time, the Gruppe was commanded by Major Franz Beyer and was fighting in Defense of the Reich. On 26 February, IV. Gruppe moved to the airfield at Salzwedel where it remained until 7 June.  That day, Major Friedrich-Karl Müller took command of the Gruppe after Beyer had been killed in action.

Defense of the Reich
In IV. Gruppe, Loos was assigned to Sturmstaffel 1, headed by Major Hans-Günter von Kornatzki. The Sturmstaffel was an experimental unit flying the so-called Sturmböcke (battering ram) up-gunned Focke-Wulf Fw 190 A-7 and A-8 aircraft. On 8 May, the Sturmstaffel became the 11. Staffel (11th squadron) and was then placed under the command of Oberleutnant Werner Gerth. Loos was credited with his first aerial victory on 6 March when the United States Strategic Air Forces (USAAF) Eighth Air Force sent 730 heavy bombers to Berlin. In the vicinity of Braunschweig, IV. Gruppe made a head-on attack and Loos was credited with an Herausschuss (separation shot)—a severely damaged heavy bomber forced to separate from its combat box which was counted as an aerial victory—over a Boeing B-17 Flying Fortress bomber.

On 22 April, 803 bombers of the USAAF Eighth Air Force targeted various German transportation targets in western Germany, in particular the railroad classification yard in Hamm. IV. Gruppe was scrambled at 18:20 in Salzwedel and engaged Consolidated B-24 Liberator bombers from the 2nd Air Division at 19:40 in a 20 minute aerial during which Loos shot down one of the B-24 bombers.

Flying the Ta 152
Loos joined the Geschwaderstab (headquarters unit) of Jagdgeschwader 301 (JG 301—301st Fighter Wing) in April 1945. The Geschwaderstab of JG 301 had been equipped with the Focke-Wulf Ta 152 H in March and was commanded by Oberstleutnant Fritz Aufhammer. The Geschwaderstab moved to an airfield at Neustadt-Glewe on 10 April. On 20 April, Oberfeldwebel Loos received the Knight's Cross of the Iron Cross. That day, fellow JG 301 pilot Oberfeldwebel Willi Reschke was also awarded the Knight's Cross. Loos claimed his first two aerial victories flying the Ta 152 on 24 April when he downed two Soviet Yakovlev Yak-9 fighters near Berlin. On 30 April, he claimed his last aerial victory when he again shot down a Yak-9 fighter.

Summary of career

Aerial victory claims
According to Obermaier, Loos flew 66 missions during his combat career in which he claimed 38 aerial victories. He claimed seven victories in the Eastern Front and 31 over the Western Front, including 21 four-engine bombers. Nine claims were made flying the Ta 152 and he was shot down nine times. Forsyth lists him with 22 four-engined bombers shot down. Mathews and Foreman, authors of Luftwaffe Aces — Biographies and Victory Claims, researched the German Federal Archives and state that he was credited with more than 14 aerial victory claims, plus six further unconfirmed claims. This figure of confirmed claims includes at least three aerial victories on the Eastern Front and at least eleven on the Western Front, including at least ten four-engine bombers.

Victory claims were logged to a map-reference (PQ = Planquadrat), for example "PQ DF-DG". These sectors were then subdivided into 36 smaller units to give a location area 3 × 4 km in size.

Awards
 German Cross in Gold on 29 September 1944 as Feldwebel in Stab/Jagdgeschwader 300
 Knight's Cross of the Iron Cross on 20 April 1945 as Oberfeldwebel and pilot in the Stab/Jagdgeschwader 300

Notes

References

Citations

Bibliography

 
 
 
 
 
 
 
 
 
 
 
 
 
 

1923 births
2004 deaths
Recipients of the Gold German Cross
Recipients of the Knight's Cross of the Iron Cross
German World War II flying aces
German Air Force pilots
Military personnel from Rhineland-Palatinate
People from Mainz-Bingen